Tipsport liga is an annual winter football tournament for clubs from the Czech Republic and occasionally surrounding countries. FK Mladá Boleslav is the current champion. It was known as Tipsport Cup from 1998 to 2007.

Results by year

International teams
  Dynamo Dresden (2010)
  FC Spartak Trnava (2008), (2011)
  FK Inter Bratislava (2008), (2009) 
  MFK Dubnica (2009), (2010), (2011) 
  FC Petržalka akadémia (2009), (2010) 
  FC Nitra (2009, 2019) 
  MŠK Žilina (2009), (2010), (2011)
  MFK Ružomberok (2009) 
  FK Dukla Banská Bystrica (2009)
  AS Trenčín (2010), (2011)
  FK Senica (2010)
  MŠK Žilina II (2010) 
  MFK Tatran Liptovský Mikuláš (2010), (2011)
  FC ViOn Zlaté Moravce (2011)
  Spartak Myjava (2011)
  FK Poprad (2017, 2018, 2019)
  Podbeskidzie Bielsko-Biała (2017)
  MFK Skalica (2017, 2018)
  1. FC Tatran Prešov (2019)

References

External links
 

Football competitions in the Czech Republic
Czech football friendly trophies